Peter Jo Messitte (born July 17, 1941) is a senior United States district judge of the United States District Court for the District of Maryland.

Early life and education
Messitte was born on July 17, 1941 in Washington, D.C. He graduated in 1959 from Bethesda-Chevy Chase High School and was greatly influenced by John F. Kennedy's speech to his graduating class. Messitte received a Bachelor of Arts degree from Amherst College in 1963 and a Juris Doctor from the University of Chicago Law School in 1966.

Peace Corps service and career as lawyer
He was a Peace Corps volunteer in São Paulo, Brazil, from 1966 to 1968. He was in private practice in Washington, D.C., from 1969 to 1971. He was in private practice in Chevy Chase, Maryland, from 1971 to 1985.

State judicial service
In 1982, after sixteen years in private law practice, Messitte ran for a seat on the Maryland Circuit Court for Montgomery County; he lost the race, but Governor Harry R. Hughes appointed him to the court in 1985. He served on the bench until he was appointed to the federal bench in 1993. On the state court, Messitte issued an order in 1989 that temporarily halted a shopping mall proposal in Silver Spring. He also presided over the bench trial of Montgomery County police officer Christopher J. Albrecht, who was convicted of involuntary manslaughter. Messitte also wrote many articles on the impact of AIDS on the criminal justice system, and participated in a reform of Maryland's adoption laws.

Federal judicial service
On August 6, 1993, Messitte was nominated by President Bill Clinton to a seat on the United States District Court for the District of Maryland vacated by Joseph C. Howard, Sr. Messitte was confirmed by the United States Senate on October 18, 1993, and received his commission two days later. He assumed senior status on September 1, 2008.

Notable rulings
In 2001, Messitte sentenced Dustin John Higgs to die, making him the first person sentenced to death in federal court in Maryland. Higgs ordered the 1996 murders of three women on an isolated road in Beltsville, on federal land.

In 2014, in a trademark case brought by Barrett Green against the Washington Redskins (Green v. Pro Football, Inc. d/b/a The Washington Redskins), Messitte banned the use of the controversial slur "Redskins") in his courtroom and in court documents, "unless reference is made to a direct quote where the name appears."

In 2018, in the case D.C. and Maryland v. Trump, Messitte denied Donald Trump's motion to dismiss a lawsuit brought by Maryland and the District of Columbia against Trump alleging violation of the Domestic Emoluments Clause and Foreign Emoluments Clause of the U.S. Constitution. A three-judge panel of the U.S. Court of Appeals for the Fourth Circuit dismissed the case in July 2019, with the panel ruling that the Maryland and D.C. attorneys general lacked legal standing to sue.  All three judges were appointed by Republican presidents. However, the full court vacated the panel decision, and voted to rehear the appeal en banc. In a May 2020 decision, the full Fourth Circuit rejected Trump's attempt to have the case dismissed on the grounds of "presidential immunity" by a 9-to-6 majority, reviving the lawsuit.

Messitte was assigned to preside over a challenge to the Purple Line (a light rail line to be built in Maryland), but he recused himself in 2020 because his home is near a future Purple Line station.

In HIAS Inc. v. Trump (2020), Messite issued a nationwide preliminary injunction blocking Trump's executive order that required refugee-resettlement organizations to obtain letters of consent from states and local jurisdictions before settling refugees. Ruling in favor of Church World Service, Lutheran Immigration and Refugee Service, and HIAS, Messite found that giving governors and other state and local officials "the power to veto where refugees may be resettled" contravened the Refugee Act of 1980's text, structure, purpose, and congressional intent, and also was a likely violation of the Administrative Procedure Act. Messite also ruled that the executive order "does not appear to serve the overall public interest" but "granting the preliminary injunctive relief Plaintiffs seek does." The Fourth Circuit affirmed Messitte's order.

Other activities
Messitte has spent decades working on judicial reform activities internationally, principally in Brazil, but also in other Latin American countries and in  Turkey, Thailand, and Yemen. He speaks Spanish and Portuguese. He serves as a special advisor (and former member) of the ABA Rule of Law Initiative's Latin America and Caribbean Division. He is the director of the Brazil-U.S. Legal & Judicial Studies Program at the American University Washington College of Law.

Messitte's work in Brazil has emphasized the need for independence of the judiciary and other factors, such as strong judicial recruitment and training, fairly applying the law, and granting sufficient funding and other resources to the judiciary. During Brazil's transition to democracy, Messitte helped Brazil as it established discretionary review and binding precedent for its courts. Brazil has honored Messitte for his work with the nation's judiciary: he was made an honorary citizen of São Paulo and was awarded the Order of the Southern Cross (the nation's highest award open for foreigners) by Brazilian President Michel Temer at a ceremony in the Presidential Palace of Brasilia.

See also
List of Jewish American jurists

References

Sources

1941 births
Bethesda-Chevy Chase High School alumni
Living people
Judges of the United States District Court for the District of Maryland
Peace Corps volunteers
People from Washington, D.C.
United States district court judges appointed by Bill Clinton
20th-century American judges
21st-century American judges